Apache Cordova (formerly PhoneGap) is a mobile application development framework created by Nitobi. Adobe Systems purchased Nitobi in 2011, rebranded it as PhoneGap, and later released an open-source version of the software called Apache Cordova. Apache Cordova enables software programmers to build hybrid web applications for mobile devices using CSS3, HTML5, and JavaScript, instead of relying on platform-specific APIs like those in Android, iOS, or Windows Phone. It enables the wrapping up of CSS, HTML, and JavaScript code depending on the platform of the device. It extends the features of HTML and JavaScript to work with the device. The resulting applications are hybrid, meaning that they are neither truly native mobile application nor purely Web-based. They are not native because all layout rendering is done via Web views instead of the platform's native UI framework. They are not Web apps because they are packaged as apps for distribution and have access to native device APIs. Mixing native and hybrid code snippets has been possible since version 1.9.

The software was previously called just "PhoneGap", then "Apache Callback".

PhoneGap was Adobe's commercial version of Cordova along with its associated ecosystem. Many other tools and frameworks are also built on top of Cordova, including Ionic, Monaca, VoltBuilder, TACO, Onsen UI, GapDebug, App Builder, Cocoon, Framework7, Quasar Framework, Evothings Studio, NSB/AppStudio, Mobiscroll, and Telerik Platform. These tools use Cordova, and not PhoneGap for their core tools.

Contributors to the Apache Cordova project include Adobe, BlackBerry, Google, IBM, Intel, Microsoft, Mozilla, and others.

History
First developed at an iPhoneDevCamp event in San Francisco, PhoneGap went on to win the People's Choice Award at O'Reilly Media's 2009 Web 2.0 Conference, and the framework has been used to develop many apps. Apple Inc. has confirmed that the framework has its approval, even with the change to clause 3.3.1 of the Apple iPhone SDK developer license agreement 4.0 adopted in 2010. The PhoneGap framework is used by several mobile application platforms such as  Monaca, appMobi, Convertigo, ViziApps, and Worklight as the backbone of their mobile client development engine.

Adobe officially announced the acquisition of Nitobi Software (the original developer) on October 4, 2011. Coinciding with that, the PhoneGap code was contributed to the Apache Software Foundation to start a new project called Apache Cordova. The project's original name, Apache Callback, was viewed as too generic. Then, it also appears in Adobe Systems as Adobe PhoneGap and also as Adobe PhoneGap Build. The Phonegap Blog shows more details, why finally the name "Cordova" was chosen. It says: "While genesis stories of PhoneGap often vary with the teller, most committers can agree the project was born at Nitobi, when the office was on Cordova Street in Vancouver."

Early versions of PhoneGap required an Apple computer to create iOS apps and a Windows computer to create Windows Mobile apps. After September 2012, Adobe's PhoneGap Build service allows programmers to upload CSS, HTML, and JavaScript source code to a "cloud compiler" that generates apps for every supported platform. This service was discontinued in 2020.

Design and rationale
The core of an Apache Cordova application uses CSS3 and HTML5 for rendering and JavaScript for logic. HTML5 provides access to underlying hardware such as the accelerometer, camera, and GPS. However, browsers' support for HTML5-based device access is not consistent across mobile browsers, particularly older versions of Android. To overcome these limitations, Apache Cordova embeds the HTML5 code inside a native WebView on the device, using a foreign function interface to access the native resources of it.

Apache Cordova can be extended with native plug-ins, allowing developers to add more functionalities that can be called from JavaScript, making it communicate directly between the native layer and the HTML5 page. These plugins allow access to the device's accelerometer, camera, compass, file system, microphone, and more.

However, the use of Web-based technologies leads some Apache Cordova applications to run slower than native applications with similar functionality.

Supported platforms
As of version 9, Apache Cordova currently supports development for the operating systems Apple iOS, Google Android, Windows 8.1, Windows Phone 8.1 , Windows 10 and Electron (software framework) (which in turn runs on Windows, Linux and macOS). Earlier version of Apache Cordova used to support Bada, BlackBerry, Firefox OS, LG webOS, Microsoft Windows Phone (7 and 8), macOS, Nokia Symbian OS, Tizen (SDK 2.x), and Ubuntu Touch. The table below is a list of supported features for each operating system for Adobe PhoneGap/ Apache Cordova 3.

See also
 List of rich web application frameworks
 Multiple phone web-based application framework
 Quasar Framework
 RhoMobile Suite
 Cocos2d
 WinJS
 NativeScript
 Xamarin
 Flutter
 Titanium SDK
 Appery.io

References

Bibliography

External links

 

2009 software
Android (operating system) development software
Cordova
BlackBerry development software
Communication software
Integrated development environments
Mobile technology companies
Rich web application frameworks